The Hanging Gardens of Babylon were one of the Seven Wonders of the Ancient World listed by Hellenic culture. They were described as a remarkable feat of engineering with an ascending series of tiered gardens containing a wide variety of trees, shrubs, and vines, resembling a large green mountain constructed of mud bricks. It was said to have been built in the ancient city of Babylon, near present-day Hillah, Babil province, in Iraq. The Hanging Gardens' name is derived from the Greek word , which has a broader meaning than the modern English word "hanging" and refers to trees being planted on a raised structure such as a terrace.

According to one legend, the Hanging Gardens were built alongside a grand palace known as The Marvel of Mankind, by the Neo-Babylonian King Nebuchadnezzar II (who ruled between 605 and 562 BC), for his Median wife, Queen Amytis, because she missed the green hills and valleys of her homeland. This was attested to by the Babylonian priest Berossus, writing in about 290 BC, a description that was later quoted by Josephus. The construction of the Hanging Gardens has also been attributed to the legendary queen Semiramis and they have been called the Hanging Gardens of Semiramis as an alternative name.

The Hanging Gardens are the only one of the Seven Wonders for which the location has not been definitively established. There are no extant Babylonian texts that mention the gardens, and no definitive archaeological evidence has been found in Babylon. Three theories have been suggested to account for this: first, that they were purely mythical, and the descriptions found in ancient Greek and Roman writings (including those of Strabo, Diodorus Siculus and Quintus Curtius Rufus) represented a romantic ideal of an eastern garden; second, that they existed in Babylon, but were destroyed sometime around the first century AD; and third, that the legend refers to a well-documented garden that the Assyrian King Sennacherib (704–681 BC) built in his capital city of Nineveh on the River Tigris, near the modern city of Mosul.

Descriptions in classical literature 
There are five principal writers whose descriptions of Babylon exist in some form today. These writers concern themselves with the size of the Hanging Gardens, their overall design and means of irrigation, and why they were built.

Josephus quotes a description of the gardens by Berossus, a Babylonian priest of Marduk, whose writing  is the earliest known mention of the gardens. Berossus described the reign of Nebuchadnezzar II and is the only source to credit that king with the construction of the Hanging Gardens.

Diodorus Siculus (active ) seems to have consulted the 4th century BC texts of both Cleitarchus (a historian of Alexander the Great) and Ctesias of Cnidus. Diodorus ascribes the construction to a Syrian king. He states that the garden was in the shape of a square, with each side approximately four plethra long. The garden was tiered, with the uppermost gallery being 50 cubits high. The walls, 22 feet thick, were made of brick. The bases of the tiered sections were sufficiently deep to provide root growth for the largest trees, and the gardens were irrigated from the nearby Euphrates.

Quintus Curtius Rufus (fl. 1st century AD) probably drew on the same sources as Diodorus. He states that the gardens were located on top of a citadel, which was 20 stadia in circumference. He attributes the building of the gardens to a Syrian king, again for the reason that his queen missed her homeland.

The account of Strabo possibly based his description on the lost account of Onesicritus from the 4th century BC. He states that the gardens were watered by means of an Archimedes' screw leading to the gardens from the Euphrates river.

The last of the classical sources thought to be independent of the others is A Handbook to the Seven Wonders of the World by the paradoxographer Philo of Byzantium, writing in the 4th to 5th century AD. The method of raising water by screw matches that described by Strabo. Philo praises the engineering and ingenuity of building vast areas of deep soil, which had a tremendous mass, so far above the natural grade of the surrounding land, as well as the irrigation techniques.

Historical existence 

It is unclear whether the Hanging Gardens were an actual construction or a poetic creation, owing to the lack of documentation in contemporaneous Babylonian sources. There is also no mention of Nebuchadnezzar's wife Amyitis (or any other wives), although a political marriage to a Median or Persian would not have been unusual. Many records exist of Nebuchadnezzar's works, yet his long and complete inscriptions do not mention any garden. However, the gardens were said to still exist at the time that later writers described them, and some of these accounts are regarded as deriving from people who had visited Babylon. Herodotus, who describes Babylon in his Histories, does not mention the Hanging Gardens, although it could be that the gardens were not yet well known to the Greeks at the time of his visit.

To date, no archaeological evidence has been found at Babylon for the Hanging Gardens. It is possible that evidence exists beneath the Euphrates, which cannot be excavated safely at present. The river flowed east of its current position during the time of Nebuchadnezzar II, and little is known about the western portion of Babylon. Rollinger has suggested that Berossus attributed the Gardens to Nebuchadnezzar for political reasons, and that he had adopted the legend from elsewhere.

Identification with Sennacherib's gardens at Nineveh 

Oxford scholar Stephanie Dalley has proposed that the Hanging Gardens of Babylon were actually the well-documented gardens constructed by the Assyrian king Sennacherib (reigned 704 – 681 BC) for his palace at Nineveh; Dalley posits that during the intervening centuries the two sites became confused, and the extensive gardens at Sennacherib's palace were attributed to Nebuchadnezzar II's Babylon. Archaeological excavations have found traces of a vast system of aqueducts attributed to Sennacherib by an inscription on its remains, which Dalley proposes were part of an  series of canals, dams, and aqueducts used to carry water to Nineveh with water-raising screws used to raise it to the upper levels of the gardens.

Dalley bases her arguments on recent developments in the analysis of contemporary Akkadian inscriptions. Her main points are:

 The name Babylon, meaning "Gate of the Gods", was the name given to several Mesopotamian cities. Sennacherib renamed the city gates of Nineveh after gods, which suggests that he wished his city to be considered "a Babylon".
 Only Josephus names Nebuchadnezzar as the king who built the gardens; although Nebuchadnezzar left many inscriptions, none mentions any garden or engineering works. Diodorus Siculus and Quintus Curtius Rufus specify a "Syrian" king. By contrast, Sennacherib left written descriptions, and there is archaeological evidence of his water engineering. His grandson Assurbanipal pictured the mature garden on a sculptured wall panel in his palace.
 Sennacherib called his new palace and garden "a wonder for all peoples". He describes the making and operation of screws to raise water in his garden.
 The descriptions of the classical authors fit closely to these contemporary records. Before the Battle of Gaugamela in 331 BC Alexander the Great camped for four days near the aqueduct at Jerwan. The historians who travelled with him would have had ample time to investigate the enormous works around them, recording them in Greek. These first-hand accounts have not survived into modern times, but were quoted by later Greek writers.

King Sennacherib's garden was well-known not just for its beautya year-round oasis of lush green in a dusty summer landscapebut also for the marvelous feats of water engineering that maintained the garden. There was a tradition of Assyrian royal garden building. King Ashurnasirpal II (883–859 BC) had created a canal, which cut through the mountains. Fruit tree orchards were planted. Also mentioned were pines, cypresses and junipers; almond trees, date trees, ebony, rosewood, olive, oak, tamarisk, walnut, terebinth, ash, fir, pomegranate, pear, quince, fig, and grapes. A sculptured wall panel of Assurbanipal shows the garden in its maturity. One original panel and the drawing of another are held by the British Museum, although neither is on public display. Several features mentioned by the classical authors are discernible on these contemporary images.

Of Sennacherib's palace, he mentions the massive limestone blocks that reinforce the flood defences. Parts of the palace were excavated by Austin Henry Layard in the mid-19th century. His citadel plan shows contours which would be consistent with Sennacherib's garden, but its position has not been confirmed. The area has been used as a military base in recent times, making it difficult to investigate further.

The irrigation of such a garden demanded an upgraded water supply to the city of Nineveh. The canals stretched over  into the mountains. Sennacherib was proud of the technologies he had employed and describes them in some detail on his inscriptions. At the headwater of Bavian (Khinnis) his inscription mentions automatic sluice gates. An enormous aqueduct crossing the valley at Jerwan was constructed of over two million dressed stones. It used stone arches and waterproof cement. On it is written:

Sennacherib claimed that he had built a "Wonder for all Peoples", and said he was the first to deploy a new casting technique in place of the "lost-wax" process for his monumental (30 tonne) bronze castings. He was able to bring the water into his garden at a high level because it was sourced from further up in the mountains, and he then raised the water even higher by deploying his new water screws. This meant he could build a garden that towered above the landscape with large trees on the top of the terracesa stunning artistic effect that surpassed those of his predecessors.

Plants

The gardens, as depicted in artworks, featured blossoming flowers, ripe fruit, burbling waterfalls and terraces exuberant with rich foliage. Based on Babylonian literature, tradition, and the environmental characteristics of the area, some of the following plants may have been found in the gardens:

Olive (Olea europaea)
Quince (Cydonia oblonga)
Common pear (Pyrus communis)
Fig (Ficus carica)
Almond (Prunus dulcis)
Common grape vine (Vitis vinifera)
Date palm (Phoenix dactylifera)
Athel tamarisk (Tamarix aphylla)
Mt. Atlas mastic tree (Pistacia atlantica)

Imported plant varieties that may have been present in the gardens include the cedar, cypress, ebony, pomegranate, plum, rosewood, terebinth, juniper, oak, ash tree, fir, myrrh, walnut, and willow. Some of these plants were suspended over the terraces and draped over its walls with arches underneath.

See also 

 Folkewall
 Green wall
 Green roof
 Historical hydroculture
 History of gardening

References

Sources

Further reading 
 Dalley, Stephanie. 1994. "Nineveh, Babylon and the Hanging Gardens: Cuneiform and Classical Sources Reconciled." Iraq 56: 45–58. .
 Norwich, John Julius. 2009. The Great Cities In History. London: Thames & Hudson.
 Reade, Julian. 2000. "Alexander the Great and the Hanging Gardens of Babylon." Iraq 62: 195–217. .

External links 

 How the Seven Wonders of the Ancient World Work: The Hanging Gardens of Babylon
 Plants in the Hanging Gardens of Babylon
 Artistic Renditions of the Hanging Gardens and the city of Babylon
 Animation of 3D virtual Hanging Gardens of Babylon
 The Lost Gardens of Babylon Documentary produced by the PBS Series Secrets of the Dead
3D model of the hanging-gardens-babylon - The Only Progress is Human

Babylon
Babylonian art and architecture
Buildings and structures demolished in the 1st century
Gardens in Iraq
Hanging gardens
Garden design history
Nebuchadnezzar II
Sennacherib
Seven Wonders of the Ancient World
Terraced gardens
Former buildings and structures in Iraq
Lost buildings and structures
Semiramis